Speeder may refer to:

 Railroad speeder, small motorized vehicle
 Speeder (motor vessel), a 1908 launch
 Speeders (TV program), US, 2007–2009
 A speed limit breaking driver
 Speeder bike, a flying vehicle, both  fictional and real

See also
 Snow-speeder (disambiguation)
 Landspeeder